The Bundesstraße 430 is a German federal road or Bundesstraße and the east-west link between Dithmarschen and Holstein in the southern part of the state of Schleswig-Holstein.

Route 
The B 430 begins at the A 23 motorway near Schenefeld and runs via Aukrug to the A 7, which it crosses near Neumünster-Mitte. Further east of Neumünster it crosses the  A 21 near Bornhöved and continues through the Holstein Switzerland Nature Park via Ascheberg and Plön (crossing the B 76) to Lütjenburg (joining the B 202) on Hohwacht Bay on the Baltic Sea.

Scenic sections 
 Ascheberg to Lütjenburg

See also
 List of federal roads in Germany

430
B 430